Die Jakobsleiter (Jacob's Ladder) is an oratorio by Arnold Schoenberg that marks his transition from a contextual or free atonality to  the twelve-tone technique anticipated in the oratorio's use of hexachords. Though ultimately unfinished by Schoenberg, the piece was completed and prepared for performance by Schoenberg student Winfried Zillig at the request of Gertrude Schoenberg.

Schoenberg began the libretto in 1914-15, which he published as a stand-alone text in 1917. He began the music in 1915, finishing most of his work on it in 1926, and finished a small amount of orchestration in 1944, leaving 700 measures at his death.

The piece is also notable for its use of developing variation.

The fragment received a partial premiere - 160 bars - in 1958, and was premiered as far as possible in Vienna on June 16, 1961, conducted by Rafael Kubelik. All performances before 1968 were concert performances; the American premiere took place in 1968 at the Santa Fe Opera using a staging by director Bodo Igesz. It was repeated in 1980. In 1968 a "scenic performance" - the oratorio version of what for opera would be a staged performance - was given. The score was first published in 1974 by the composer's publisher Belmont.

Notable recordings include one for Columbia records with Robert Craft conducting, and one for CBS conducted by Pierre Boulez, featuring Siegmund Nimsgern as Gabriel, and with Ian Partridge, Anthony Rolfe Johnson and Mady Mesplé in other singing roles, released in 1982.

References

External links
Time.com: Schoenberg Revisited

Viewing
YouTube.com: World premiere of Arnold Schoenberg's (1874-1951) oratorio "Die Jakobsleiter" in Vienna, 1961 part I, and part II: discussion

Atonal compositions by Arnold Schoenberg
Musical compositions completed by others
Oratorios